Fillmore! is an American animated television series created by Scott M. Gimple for ABC and, later, Toon Disney. It originally ran from 2002 to 2004. A parody of popular police dramas of the 1970s, Fillmore! is centered on reformed juvenile delinquent Cornelius Fillmore and his new partner, Ingrid Third, members of the Safety Patrol at X Middle School. The series was aimed at children, but also attracted an older audience with its '70s references.

It was the last series produced by Walt Disney Television Animation for ABC, before producing shows exclusively with Disney Channel and its sister channels. The series ran for two seasons. It maintains a dedicated fanbase and is considered a cult hit. Reruns later aired on Disney Channel, Toon Disney, and Disney XD.

Premise
Twelve-year-old Cornelius Fillmore (voiced by Orlando Brown), a juvenile delinquent with a record, was caught raiding the school's new chalk shipment. He was "arrested" and given a choice by the safety patrol officer who caught him, either help him solve another case or spend the rest of middle school in detention. Fillmore decided to help out and he eventually decided to join up with the safety patrol.

The show is based around him and his partner Ingrid Third (voiced by Tara Strong) at X Middle School, which is located in the suburbs of Minneapolis and Saint Paul in Minnesota. The show's format parodies that of hard-boiled police dramas. X's safety patrol is much more actively involved in student behavior than a typical school's safety patrol, and officers often seem to spend more time patrolling than normally attending class, although they can be seen attending at times.

As part of the Safety Patrol at X Middle School, Fillmore and Ingrid solve crimes and mysteries. The series usually presents kid-friendly versions of common crimes, such as stolen scooters, smuggling tartar sauce, holding illegal frog races, and counterfeiting collector cards.

Characters
Every character is named after a street in San Francisco, California.

Main
Cornelius C. Fillmore (voiced by Orlando Brown) is a seventh grader at X Middle School and the main protagonist of the series. He is a member of the Safety Patrol. His middle name is revealed throughout the series. Fillmore was a juvenile delinquent, his crimes included (according to his permanent record) "milk counterfeiting" and "back talkery". Fillmore's life changed when Safety Patrol member Wayne Liggit gave him a choice; spend the rest of middle school in detention or help him solve another case. Fillmore was recruited into the Safety Patrol as a result of his helping out. It is revealed he is an only child, has a pet dog, and a pet fish and is skilled at mini golf. He is known for going above and beyond the standards of other Safety Patrol officers. He almost never loses a target even if it means destroying school property, which he happens to do a lot, much to the dismay of Jr. Commissioner Vallejo. Before moving to X Middle School, he lived in Cleveland, Ohio.
Ingrid Third (voiced by Tara Strong) is Fillmore's goth best friend and partner on the X Middle School Safety Patrol. Before her arrival at X Middle school, Ingrid was sent to a reform school in Nepal for an incident involving a stinkbomb and a piñata. Ingrid, another former delinquent and a certified genius (she becomes the smartest kid in X Middle School) due to her photographic memory, arrives at X Middle School and partners with Fillmore after he helped her clear her name in "Ingrid Third, Public Enemy #1". Her father is a professor and she has an older sister named Ariella. Her mother is seen but never mentioned. It is revealed in "The Unseen Reflection" that she played Little League for two years.
Horatio Vallejo (voiced by Horatio Sanz) is the junior commissioner of the Safety Patrol and Fillmore's immediate superior. Vallejo has had some rough experiences in the Safety Patrol as an officer: losing his friend and fellow safety patrol officer Malika to the Red Robins, a distorted girl scout troop after she went undercover and went bad leaving the force, and unintentionally betraying his partner and best friend, Frank Bishop, after he refused to speak out against his expulsion from the force, believing it would threaten his chances of becoming commissioner. Vallejo has issues with drinking too much cocoa, which is a kid-friendly version of issues with excessive caffeine or alcohol. Vallejo is often put at odds against Fillmore, such as when he is forced to take Fillmore off a case even though he does not want to, or Fillmore is close to solving it. He also often refuses Fillmore for his reckless destruction of school property, which usually allows Fillmore to catch the criminal, but makes both him and the safety patrol look bad. The only thing that gets Vallejo more mad is when he sees how much it is going to cost to repair the damages, caused by Fillmore. Vallejo's catchphrase is yelling "Fillmore!", which he does in almost every episode when he hears of something Fillmore broke, like a waxer, and ordering expensive walkie talkies by tricking him into signing his signature. Another running gag is that his first name is either unknown or covered up throughout the series.
Karen Tehama (voiced by Lauren Tom) is the crime scene investigator on the Safety Patrol who has a keen interest in forensics. Although she appears in almost every episode, she is more of a background character.
Joseph Anza (voiced by Danny Tamberelli): Partner of Karen Tehama, known for his bodyguarding training. Although he appears in almost every episode, he (like Tehama) is more of a background character.
Danny O'Farrell (voiced by Kyle Sullivan) is the crime scene photographer for the Safety Patrol, though it is often joked that he should not be qualified to be a Safety Patroller by Vallejo (where in one episode Danny's replacement was a tripod and in another episode comments "he isn't qualified to operate a stapler"). He has a tendency to get on other people's nerves and has some deep thoughts, overreacting, and weird ideas. O'Farrell serves as the comic relief on the show. He is also able to develop film with common household items as seen in "Masterstroke of Malevolence". His name, red hair and kilt (which he occasionally wears) characterize him as Scottish.
Dawn S. Folsom (voiced by Wendie Malick) is the principal of X Middle School, though she acts like a District Attorney or a mayor figure in crime shows or is similar to M from the James Bond series.  In context of the show's police drama parody theme, she represents the overstressed, image-conscious mayor archetype, where in every episode she threatens to turn the Safety Patrol office into something else (yoga studio, spa, etc.) if they are unable to solve the case.  Tough on the outside with looks that can stop any student in their tracks, she runs her school with a strong presence – but she does it for pride and honor.  She does have a kind heart on the inside and does much for her students and staff, sometimes anonymously. It is stated that she is about 40 years old, as in "Next Stop, Armageddon" it is her birthday, and Vallejo mentions that "this year, it starts with a 4".
Vice Principal Raycliff (voiced by Jeff Probst) is the school's vice-principal and Folsom's right-hand man. Though he acts like a secretary in crime shows, he never really says much, but can be counted on to gush out school facts, figures and catchy metaphors at the drop of a hat. It is possible that he attended school with Folsom, according to an old school album. It is revealed in "Two Wheels, Full Throttle, No Breaks" that he gets seasick.

Recurring
Mr. Collingwood (voiced by Kyle Gass) is one of the teachers at X Middle School.
Augie Sansome (voiced by Frankie Muniz in "Test of the Tested", Kiel Holmes in "This Savior, a Snitch"): In the former, he was suspected by Fillmore and Ingrid of stealing the answer sheets to the S.A.T.T.Y. 9 test, but what he really stole turned out to be packets of tartar sauce. In the later, he wound up being a witness to a set up on Filmore and is asked to testify at a student council meeting to clear Fillmore's name.
Mrs. Cornwall (voiced by Holland Taylor) is the algebra teacher at X Middle School and a student in 1956 (when voice actor Taylor was 13 years old and herself be in middle school). She strongly believes in the school's honor code. In "A Cold Day at X" she places the answer key to one of her tests out in the open to prove her belief in the code.
Librarian Lendrum (voiced by Brian George) is X Middle School's librarian.
Cheri Shotwell (voiced by Debi Derryberry) is the lively, bubbly, blonde-haired cheerleader who also serves as a reporter or interviewer. She also frequently hosts parties and sleepovers.
Philsky (voiced by Michael Welch) is the school's reporter, who usually co-anchors with Cheri.
Vern Natoma (voiced by Marcus Toji): Editor-in-chief of the school's newspaper.
Professor Third (voiced by Anthony Head): College professor and the father of Ingrid and Ariella.
Jamie Townsend (voiced by Chris Marquette) is a smart student, who wears glasses.
Proper Kid (voiced by Shaun Fleming) is a blonde-haired boy dressed like a sea captain. Which is appropriate, considering that he is a member of the Paddle Boat Club. He is so called due to his always pointing out what is fit.
Lab Coat Kid #1 (voiced by Chris Marquette): As his title suggests, he is one of the kids who wear lab coats and often involved in the lab or science class.
Wade (voiced by Michael Welch) is another blonde X Middle School reporter.
Wayne Ligget (voiced by Lukas Behnken) is Fillmore's original Safety Patrol partner before he eventually moved away and was replaced by Ingrid when she came to X. He is best friends with Fillmore, and before Ingrid became Filmore's partner, Filmore refused to have any partners because he was still greatly affected by Wayne's departure. He has light brown hair. As such, little is known about him and his background, but he is referenced a few times. However, he and Fillmore would meet up again in "South of Friendship, North of Honor", when the latter went to Tennessee where the former is  based and resides currently to take on a case there. Fillmore helps Wayne take down the schools distorted patrol sheriff and Wayne is subsequently named as his school's new safety patrol sheriff
Frankie Polk (voiced by Lukas Behnken) is a blonde-haired boy who has an affinity for sketching and painting, and as such, is president of the Art Club.

Production
The theme song for the show was written and performed by filk band Ookla the Mok. It appears on their album Super Secret, as the intro to the song "Das Über Tüber, or the Mystery of Mr. P."

The announcer of the series was voice actor Don LaFontaine, best known for his catchphrase "In a world...".

Episodes

Series overview

Season 1 (2002–03)
{{Episode table |background=#DBA901 |overall=6 |season=6 |title=27 |director=15 |writer=27 |airdate=17 |airdateR= |episodes=

{{Episode list
 |EpisodeNumber=9
 |EpisodeNumber2=9
 |Title=A Cold Day at X
 |DirectedBy=Christian Roman
 |WrittenBy=Eddie Guzelian
 |OriginalAirDate=
 |ShortSummary=Mrs. Cornwall's Pre-Algebra final exam looks like it is going to be a tough one; however, four of her students have decided to take more extreme measures beyond studying. Fillmore sleeps over in the school to safeguard the exam, but an unexpected blizzard and officer Third's head cold leaves him standing alone to face a desperate gang of determined exam thieves.

Guest starring Holland Taylor

Parodied crimes: burglary and taking of hostages, along with Die Hard'''s "lone cop vs. gang of villains" plot
 |LineColor=DBA901
}}

}}

Season 2 (2003–04)

BroadcastFillmore! premiered on ABC's Saturday morning programming block, ABC Kids, on September 14, 2002. The show continued to air on the block through the next two seasons. On March 8, 2003, Disney Channel added the series to their lineup, beginning with a three-hour marathon in primetime. Reruns continued until September 2, 2003, when the series (alongside The Legend of Tarzan and Buzz Lightyear of Star Command) was pre-empted in favor of a 90-minute showing of Recess.

On September 2, 2003, reruns began airing on Toon Disney, and the final five episodes aired on the channel in January 2004. It was also aired on Disney XD until August 2009. It was briefly shown again on April 19, 2018.

Home media release
While the series has never been released on VHS or DVD, all 26 episodes are available (for digital download) dubbed in German from iTunes Germany and Amazon Germany. It also appears on Google Play but is currently unavailable to buy. Fillmore!'' was released on streaming via Disney+ in the United Kingdom and the Republic of Ireland on July 27, 2022. It is also advertised on Apple TV.

References

External links

Official Site
 
 

2000s American animated television series
2000s American black cartoons
2000s American parody television series
2000s American school television series
2002 American television series debuts
2004 American television series endings
American children's animated action television series
American children's animated comedy television series
American Broadcasting Company original programming
ABC Kids (TV programming block)
Toon Disney original programming
Black characters in animation
Child characters in animation
English-language television shows
Middle school television series
Television series by Disney Television Animation
Television shows set in Minnesota
Animated television series about children